The 2007 Ireland rugby union tour of Argentina was a series of matches played in June 2007 in Argentina by Ireland national rugby union team.

The Irish team, was very renewed, Eddie O'Sullivan tested many new players, and stars like Ronan O'Gara, Brian O'Driscoll remain at home, to rest before the starting of training for 2007 Rugby World Cup. In the first match, Irish lose a tight match, but had a bad defeat in the second.

Touring party
Complete list of Ireland personnel:
Manager: Eddie O'Sullivan
Captain: Simon Best

Backs

 Isaac Boss (Ballymena RFC/Ulster)
 Tommy Bowe (Belfast Harlequins/Ulster)
 Brian Carney (Clonakilty/Munster)
 Gavin Duffy (Galwegians RFC/Connacht)
 Robert Kearney (UCD/Leinster)
 Kieran Lewis (St. Mary's College RFC/Leinster)
 Barry Murphy (UL Bohemians/Munster)
 Geordan Murphy (Leicester Tigers)
 Tomás O'Leary (Dolphin RFC/Munster)
 Eoin Reddan (London Wasps)
 Jeremy Staunton (London Wasps)
 Andrew Trimble (Ballymena RFC/Ulster)
 Paddy Wallace (Ballymena RFC/Ulster)

Forwards
 Neil Best (Belfast Harlequins/Ulster)
 Simon Best (Belfast Harlequins/Ulster)

 Peter Bracken (London Wasps)
 Tony Buckley (Shannon RFC/Munster)
 Leo Cullen (Leicester Tigers)
 Stephen Ferris (Dungannon RFC/Ulster)
 Jerry Flannery (Shannon RFC/Munster)
 Keith Gleeson (St. Mary's College RFC/Leinster)
 Jamie Heaslip (Clontarf RFC/Leinster)
 Trevor Hogan (Shannon RFC/Leinster)
 Bernard Jackman (Clontarf RFC/Leinster)
 Shane Jennings (Leicester Tigers)
 Mick O'Driscoll (Cork Constitution/Munster)
 Malcolm O'Kelly (St. Mary's College RFC/Leinster)
 Alan Quinlan (Shannon RFC/Munster) 
 Frankie Sheahan (Cork Constitution/Munster)
 Bryan Young (Ballymena RFC/Ulster)

Match details

First test

Second test

References

2007
2007
2007 rugby union tours
tour
2007 in Argentine rugby union
History of rugby union matches between Argentina and Ireland